Douglas Mitchell Corbett (born November 4, 1952) is an American former Major League Baseball (MLB) relief pitcher who played for the Minnesota Twins, California Angels and Baltimore Orioles between 1980 and 1987.

Early years 
Doug Corbett was born in Sarasota, Florida in 1952. He attended Sarasota High School, and played high school baseball for the Sarasota Sailors.

College career 
Corbett accepted an athletic scholarship to attend the University of Florida in Gainesville, Florida, where he played for coach Dave Fuller's Florida Gators baseball team from 1971 to 1974. In 1972, he played collegiate summer baseball with the Harwich Mariners of the Cape Cod Baseball League and was named a league all-star. He was a recognized as a first-team All-Southeastern Conference selection as a pitcher in 1974.  Corbett graduated from the University of Florida with a bachelor's degree in exercise and sport science in 1974, and was inducted into the University of Florida Athletic Hall of Fame as a "Gator Great" in 1996.

Professional career 
In his rookie season with the Twins, Corbett saved twenty-three games and placed third in the Major League Baseball Rookie of the Year Award voting in the American League.  The following year, he was elected to the American League All-Star team.

See also 

 Florida Gators
 List of Florida Gators baseball players
 List of University of Florida alumni
 List of University of Florida Athletic Hall of Fame members

References

External links 

1952 births
Living people
American expatriate baseball players in Canada
American League All-Stars
Baltimore Orioles players
Baseball players from Florida
California Angels players
Edmonton Trappers players
Florida Gators baseball players
Gulf Coast Royals players
Harwich Mariners players
Indianapolis Indians players
Major League Baseball pitchers
Minnesota Twins players
Nashville Sounds players
Orlando Juice players
Sarasota High School alumni
Spokane Indians players
Sportspeople from Sarasota, Florida
Tampa Tarpons (1957–1987) players
Trois-Rivières Aigles players